Endendigu is a 2015 Indian Kannada romantic thriller film written directed by Imran Sardhariya, and stars Ajay Rao and Radhika Pandit in the lead roles. The supporting cast features Shanthamma, Ashok, Kalyani Raju, Pavitra Lokesh, Tabla Nani and H. G. Dattatreya.

The film tells the story of a newly wed couple, Jyothi (Pandit) and Krishna (Rao), who move to Sweden, where Jyoti gets precognitive dreams foreseeing Krishna's death, and how she goes about with preventing it. Released on 1 May 2015, the film received positive to mixed reviews from critics, though the performance of Radhika Pandit was highlighted.

Cast
 Ajay Rao as Krishna
 Radhika Pandit as Jyothi
 H. G. Dattatreya
 Ashok
 Chandrashekhar
 Raveendranath
 Kalyani Raju
 Tabla Nani
 Sumithra
 Pavitra Lokesh
 Shanthamma
 B. Suresha
 Anmol (credited as Master Anmol)
 V. Harikrishna as himself (Special Appearance in "Friendu Maduve")
 Yogaraj Bhat as himself (Special Appearance in "Friendu Maduve")
 Dhananjay as himself (Special Appearance in "Friendu Maduve")
 Sadhu Kokila as himself (Special Appearance in "Friendu Maduve")
 P. Ravi Shankar as himself (Special Appearance in "Friendu Maduve")

Production
Choreographer Imran Sardhariya made his debut with the film as a director. After the film was announced in 2013, Srinagar Kitty and Ramya were signed to play the lead roles. However, after the latter got busy with her political career, the pair was dropped, and Ajay Rao and Radhika Pandit were cast. Rao and Pandit were collaborating for the third time after Krishnan Love Story (2010) and Breaking News (2012). Filming began in November 2013 in Sweden, where song sequences were shot.

Soundtrack

V. Harikrishna composed the film's background score and music for its soundtrack. The soundtrack album was released on 27 March 2015. It consists of five tracks.

Reception
Upon release, the album was received well by critics. Indiaglitz in its review called the tracks "top class in melody and lyrical strength." Cienloka.com, reviewed the album and wrote, "ENDENDIGU definitely has class written all over. Audience will surely appreciate the efforts of HK [V. Harikrishna] for churning out chartbusters with ease. Album guarantees Melody coupled with wholesome entertainment in its lavish package."

References

External links
 

2015 films
2015 psychological thriller films
2010s romantic thriller films
Indian psychological thriller films
Indian romantic thriller films
2010s Kannada-language films